Scalzo is a surname of Italian origin that means "barefoot." It has also been used as an insult for a poor person, specifically someone believed to be too poor to own shoes.

Notable people with the surname Scalzo
Christopher R. Scalzo (born 1963), American politician and businessman
Giovanni Scalzo (born 1959), Italian fencer
Mario Scalzo (born 1984), Canadian professional ice hockey player
Petey Scalzo (1917-1993), American boxer
Tony Scalzo (born 1964), American rock musician and songwriter

See also
Vincent LoScalzo, former boss of the Trafficante crime family in Florida

References